Osvaldo Aquino (born 28 January 1952 in San Lorenzo, Paraguay) is a former football midfielder/winger and coach.

Playing career
Aquino started his career in the youth divisions of Atlético Triunfo and went on to play for several other teams from the San Lorenzo area before signing for Guaraní of the Paraguayan 1st division in 1973. In 1974, he was signed by Olimpia Asunción, where he became one of the most emblematic players of the club by winning several national and international championships in his 10-year career at the club. Aquino's highlights at Olimpia include scoring the first goal in the Copa Libertadores 1979 final against Boca Juniors, winning the Intercontinental Cup in 1979 and winning six consecutive Paraguayan 1st division titles from 1978 to 1983. He finished his career in 1985 playing for San Lorenzo and Cerro Corá.

Aquino was also part of the Paraguay national football team that won the Copa America 1979.

Managerial career
Aquino received his certification in 1989 and some of his coaching jobs included managing the youth divisions of San Lorenzo, head coach of Atlético Triunfo and member of the technical staff of Club Libertad in 2001 and 2002.

Titles

National

International

Awards

References

1952 births
Living people
Paraguay international footballers
Copa América-winning players
1979 Copa América players
Paraguayan footballers
Club Guaraní players
Club Olimpia footballers
Paraguayan football managers
People from San Lorenzo, Paraguay
Association football midfielders